Gloria Feldt (born April 13, 1942) is a New York Times best-selling author, speaker, commentator, and feminist activist who gained national recognition as a social and political advocate of women's rights. In 2013, she and Amy Litzenberger founded Take the Lead, a nonprofit initiative with a goal to propel women to leadership parity by 2025. She is a former CEO and president of Planned Parenthood Federation of America, directing the organization from 1996 to 2005.

Early life and career 

Gloria Feldt was born on April 13, 1942 in Temple, Texas. She earned her Bachelor of Arts degree in 1974 from the University of Texas Permian Basin.

Feldt joined Planned Parenthood in 1974 at the Permian Basin Planned Parenthood office (now Planned Parenthood of West Texas). Beginning in 1978, she headed the organization's Central Northern Arizona office. "Her superlative compassion and conviction," according to Women in the World Foundation, "combined with her intelligence and charisma, have carried her from teenage motherhood in West Texas to a thirty-year career with the reproductive health provider and advocacy group Planned Parenthood Federation of America." Feldt ran the Central Northern Arizona Planned Parenthood office during a time when family planning was becoming increasingly controversial and politically charged. During this time, she travelled with a bodyguard and avoided working in well-lit, open offices with large windows which could be targeted by protestors.

From 1996 to 2005, Feldt was CEO and president of Planned Parenthood Federation of America. She was the architect of contraceptive coverage by insurance.

She was active early in her career in the civil rights movement. Feldt often comments on women's issues, including in a June 2012 Salon online magazine article. MSNBC interviewed her for a piece about the War on Women that aired March 19, 2012. The New York Times''' Adriana Gardella did a Q&A with Feldt in 2010, featuring her in the newspaper's business section.

As president of Take The Lead, Feldt oversees learning programs, mentoring, networking, and role modelling programs for women. She is a professor at Arizona State University, where she teaches the course Women, Power, and Leadership. She also serves on the boards of the Women's Media Center and the Jewish Women's Archive and on the advisory board of Our Bodies, Ourselves.

 Appearances 

Feldt is a frequent public speaker, lecturing at universities, civic and professional organizations, as well as national and international conferences on women's rights, politics, leadership, media, and health. In October 2011, she sat on a panel, moderated by attorney mediator Victoria Pynchon, with feminist leaders Gloria Steinem, Shelby Knox and Jamia Wilson at the South Carolina Women Lawyers Association annual conference She has also appeared in several forums on C-SPAN's Book TV.

In addition to speaking engagements, she tours with an intergenerational feminist panel titled WomenGirlsLadies.

 Writing 

Feldt's commentary has appeared in The New York Times, USA Today, The Wall Street Journal, and The Washington Post, among other publications. She has contributed also to Truthout, The Daily Beast, Salon.com, ForbesWoman, Democracy Journal, Women's eNews, The Huffington Post, WIMN's Voices, the Women's Media Center, the International Leadership Forum's ilfpost, BlogHer, and on her personal website.

Feldt has written several books. Her latest, No Excuses: 9 Ways Women Can Change How We Think About Power, was published by Seal Press in October 2010.

 Works 

 Behind Every Choice is a Story (University of North Texas Press, 2003) 
 The War on Choice: The Right-Wing Attack on Women's Rights and How to Fight Back (Bantam Dell, 2004) 
 Send Yourself Roses: Thoughts on My Life, Love, and Leading Roles (Springboard, 2008), co-authored with actress Kathleen Turner and a New York Times best seller. 
 No Excuses: 9 Ways Women Can Change How We Think About Power (Seal Press, 2010) 

 Awards and recognition 

 New York Newswomen Front Page Award, 2007
 Women's eNews, 21 Leaders for the 21st Century, 2007
 Women Lawyers Los Angeles, Courage Award, 2005
 Arizona Civil Liberties Union, Civil Libertarian of the Year, 2005
 Planned Parenthood Golden Gate Sarah Weddington Award, 2005
 Planned Parenthood Federation of America, Margaret Sanger Award, 2005
 Glamour Magazine, Woman of the Year, 2003
 Vanity Fair magazine, America's Top 200 Women Leaders, Legends and Trailblazers, 1998
 World Academy of Art and Science, Special Award, 1998
 Texas Monthly Texas Twenty 1996
 City of Phoenix Human Relations Commission, Martin Luther King Jr. Living the Dream Award, 1996
 National Organization for Women, Sun City Chapter, Golden Apple Award, 1995
 Soroptimist International, Women Helping Women Award, 1994 and 1998
 Planned Parenthood National Executive Directors Council Ruth Green Award, 1990
 Woman of Achievement, 1987, Junior League, Mujer, and AAUW
 New Times'', Best of Phoenix, 1987

Personal life 

At age 15, Feldt married her college-age boyfriend and had three children by the time she was 20. She currently lives with her husband Alex Barbanell and splits her time between New York City and Scottsdale, Arizona.

References

External links 

 
 Take The Lead Women
 "Why women must seize this moment," CNN Opinion, by Gloria Feldt
 
 Planned Parenthood site
 Seal Press author page 
 

1942 births
American feminists
American non-fiction writers
American abortion-rights activists
American women's rights activists
Feminist bloggers
Jewish American writers
Jewish feminists
Jewish women writers
Living people
Presidents of Planned Parenthood
University of Texas Permian Basin alumni
Writers from Arizona
Writers from Texas
21st-century American women writers
American women bloggers
American bloggers
21st-century American Jews